The Soleau envelope, named after its French inventor, is a sealed envelope serving as proof of priority for inventions valid in France, exclusively to precisely ascertain the date of an invention, idea or creation of a work. It can be applied for at the French National Institute of Industrial Property. The working principles were defined in the ruling of May 9, 1986, published in the official gazette of June 6, 1986 (Journal officiel de la République française or JORF), although the institution of the Soleau envelope dates back to 1915.

The envelope has two compartments which must each contain the identical version of the element for which registration is sought. The INPI laser-marks some parts of the envelope for the sake of delivery date authentication and sends one of the compartments back to the original depositary who submitted the envelope.

The originator must keep their part of the envelope sealed except in case of litigation. The deposit can be made at the INPI, by airmail, or at the INPI's regional subsidiaries. The envelope is kept for a period of five years, and the term can be renewed once.

The envelope may not contain any hard element such as cardboard, rubber, computer disks, leather, staples, or pins. Each compartment can only contain up to seven A4-size paper sheets, with a maximum of  thickness. If the envelope is deemed inadmissible, it is sent back to the depositary at their own expense.

Unlike a patent or utility model, the depositor has no exclusivity right over the claimed element. The Soleau envelope, as compared to a later patent, only allows use of the technique, rather than ownership, and multiple people might submit envelopes to support separate similar use, before a patent is later granted to restrict application.

See also 
Poor man's copyright

Reference list

External links 
The envelope Soleau on the French IP institute website 

Envelopes
French intellectual property law